The Communion of Churches in Indonesia is a national ecumenical body in Indonesia. It was founded in 1950. It is a member of the World Council of Churches.

External links 
Official website
World Council of Churches listing

National councils of churches
Christian organizations established in 1950
 
Christian organizations based in Asia
Christianity in Indonesia